Brief Encounter is a 1945 British film.

Brief Encounter may also refer to:

Film and TV
 Brief Encounter (1974 film), a British-Italian drama
 Gregory Crewdson: Brief Encounters, a 2012 documentary about art photographer Gregory Crewdson
 Brief Encounters, a 2016 British TV series
 "Brief Encounter", 1990 episode of Birds of a Feather
 "Brief Encounter", 2021 episode of Family Guy

Music
 Brief Encounter (opera), a 2009 opera by André Previn, based on the 1945 film
 Brief Encounter (album), an album by Marillion
 Brief Encounter, an album released in 2006 by jazz musician Eddie Daniels
 Brief Encounters, an album by Amanda Lear

"Just A Brief Encounter,"	Dinah Shore	1962